Elections to North Down Borough Council were held on 17 May 1989 on the same day as the other Northern Irish local government elections. The election used four  district electoral areas to elect a total of 24 councillors.

Prior to the election three Ulster Unionist politicians, including George Green, had defected to the Conservative Party in Northern Ireland. The election saw the Conservative presence in North Down doubling, with the Conservatives emerging as the single largest party on the council.

Election results

Note: "Votes" are the first preference votes.

Districts summary

|- class="unsortable" align="centre"
!rowspan=2 align="left"|Ward
! % 
!Cllrs
! %
!Cllrs
! %
!Cllrs
! %
!Cllrs
! %
!Cllrs
! %
!Cllrs
!rowspan=2|TotalCllrs
|- class="unsortable" align="center"
!colspan=2 bgcolor="" | Conservative
!colspan=2 bgcolor="" | UUP
!colspan=2 bgcolor="" | Alliance
!colspan=2 bgcolor="" | DUP
!colspan=2 bgcolor="" | UPUP
!colspan=2 bgcolor="white"| Others
|-
|align="left"|Abbey
|19.2
|1
|12.4
|1
|12.9
|1
|25.6
|1
|bgcolor="#FFF2CE"|29.9
|bgcolor="#FFF2CE"|2
|0.0
|0
|6
|-
|align="left"|	Ballyholme and Groomsport
|bgcolor="#0077FF"|27.5
|bgcolor="#0077FF"|2
|25.4
|1
|24.1
|1
|12.4
|1
|0.0
|0
|10.6
|1
|6
|-
|align="left"|Bangor West
|bgcolor="#0077FF"|26.7
|bgcolor="#0077FF"|2
|23.0
|2
|19.3
|1
|14.5
|1
|0.0
|0
|16.5
|1
|7
|-
|align="left"|Holywood
|24.6
|1
|24.1
|1
|bgcolor="#F6CB2F"|25.2
|bgcolor="#F6CB2F"|1
|11.7
|1
|0.0
|0
|14.4
|1
|5
|- class="unsortable" class="sortbottom" style="background:#C9C9C9"
|align="left"| Total
|24.9
|6
|21.7
|5
|20.7
|4
|15.5
|4
|5.9
|2
|11.3
|3
|24
|-
|}

Districts results

Abbey

1985: 2 x DUP, 2 x UUP, 1 x Alliance, 1 x UPUP
1989: 2 x UPUP, 1 x DUP, 1 x Conservative, 1 x Alliance, 1 x UUP
1985-1989 Change: UPUP and Conservative gain from DUP and UUP

Ballyholme and Groomsport

1985: 2 x UUP, 2 x Alliance, 1 x DUP, 1 x Independent Unionist
1989: 2 x Conservative, 1 x UUP, 1 x Alliance, 1 x DUP, 1 x Independent Unionist
1985-1989 Change: Conservatives (two seats) gain from UUP and Alliance

Bangor West

1985: 2 x UUP, 2 x Alliance, 2 x DUP, 1 x UPUP
1989: 2 x Conservative, 2 x UUP, 1 x Alliance, 1 x DUP, 1 x Independent
1985-1989 Change: Conservatives (two seats) and Independent gain from Alliance, DUP and UPUP

Holywood

1985: 2 x UUP, 2 x Alliance, 1 x DUP
1989: 1 x Alliance, 1 x Conservative, 1 x UUP, 1 x DUP, 1 x Independent
1985-1989 Change: Conservative and Independent gain from UUP and Alliance

References

North Down Borough Council elections
North Down